The United States is party to many free-trade agreements (FTAs) worldwide. 

Beginning with the Theodore Roosevelt administration, the United States became a major player in international trade, especially with its neighboring territories in the Caribbean and Latin America. Today, the United States has become a leader of the free trade movement, standing behind groups such as the General Agreement on Tariffs and Trade (later the World Trade Organization).

Past free trade agreements 
 : Canada–United States Free Trade Agreement (1988; superseded by NAFTA)
  North American Free Trade Agreement (NAFTA) (includes Canada and Mexico; 1994; replaced by USMCA)

Free trade agreements in force
Here is a list of free trade agreements of which the United States is part. In parentheses, the abbreviation, if applicable, membership if not stated before, and the date of coming into force are to be seen.
 : Israel–United States Free Trade Agreement (includes Palestinian Authority; 1985)
 : Jordan–United States Free Trade Agreement (2001)
 : Australia–United States Free Trade Agreement (2004)
 : Chile–United States Free Trade Agreement (2004)
 : Singapore–United States Free Trade Agreement (2004)
 : Bahrain–United States Free Trade Agreement (2006)
 : Morocco–United States Free Trade Agreement (2006)
 : Oman–United States Free Trade Agreement (2006)
 : Peru–United States Trade Promotion Agreement (2007)
  Dominican Republic–Central America Free Trade Agreement (DR-CAFTA; includes Costa Rica, El Salvador, Guatemala, Honduras, Nicaragua, and the Dominican Republic; 2009)
 : United States–South Korea Free Trade Agreement (2010)
 : United States–Colombia Free Trade Agreement (2012)
 : Panama–United States Trade Promotion Agreement (2012)

  : United States–Mexico–Canada Agreement (USMCA) (2020; replaced NAFTA)

Proposed free trade agreements
The United States has started negotiating bilateral and multilateral free trade agreements with the following countries and blocs:
 Free Trade Area of the Americas (FTAA; includes all countries on the Western Hemisphere, except Cuba)
 U.S.–Middle East Free Trade Area (US–MEFTA; includes most countries in the Middle East)
: United States-United Kingdom FTA
 : United States–Thailand Free Trade Agreement (on hold since the 2006 Thai coup d'état)
 : US–New Zealand Free Trade Agreement
 : US–Ghana Free Trade Agreement
 : US–Indonesia Free Trade Agreement
 : US–Kenya Free Trade Agreement
 : US–Kuwait Free Trade Agreement (Expert-level trade talks held in February 2006)
 : US–Malaysia Free Trade Agreement (last meeting was in July 2008)
 : US–Mauritius Free Trade Agreement
 : US–Mozambique Free Trade Agreement
 : US–Taiwan Free Trade Agreement
 : US–United Arab Emirates Free Trade Agreement (5th round of talks are yet to be scheduled)
 : US–Ecuador Free Trade Agreement 
 : US–Qatar Free Trade Agreement (on hold since 2006)

See also

 Trade and Investment Framework Agreement
 Bilateral Investment Treaty
 European Union free trade agreements
 List of free trade agreements

References

External links
 The Transatlantic Colossus: Global Contributions to Broaden the Debate on the EU-US Free Trade Agreement A collaborative publication with over 20 articles on the global implications of the TAFTA | TTIP

History of the foreign relations of the United States
Free trade agreements